The following is a list of musical works by Faye-Ellen Silverman.

Opera and musical theatre 
 K. 1971 for narrators, tenor, bass, female chorus, chamber ensemble and electronic tape (1972); based on Kafka's The Trial, added texts from the Kafka Diaries, Balzac, and the Chinese poet Wen Yiduo.
 The Miracle of Nemirov, opera in 1 act (1974); libretto by the composer based on a short story by I. L. Peretz.
 A Free Pen, cantata for narrator, soprano, alto, tenor, bass, chorus (8 singers) and chamber ensemble (1990); libretto compiled by the composer from texts by Socrates, Spinoza, Zenger, and others

Orchestra
 Madness for narrator and chamber orchestra (1972)
 Stirrings for chamber orchestra (1979)
 Winds and Sines for orchestra (1981)
 Adhesions for orchestra (1987)
 Candlelight for piano and orchestra (1988)
 Just For Fun for chamber orchestra (1994)
 Orchestral Tides for clarinet and chamber orchestra (2012/13)

Large chamber ensemble
 Shadings for fl, ob, alto sax, bn, hn, tuba, 2 perc, vln, vla, cb (1978)
 No Strings for fl/picc, ob, bcl, bn, alto sax, hn, tpt, tb, tuba, and 1 perc (1982)
 Passing Fancies for picc/fl, ob, cl/bcl, bn, hn, tpt, tb, perc, 2 vln, vla, vc, cb (1985)
 Bridges in Time for tpt, perc, 4 vln, 2 vla, 2 vc, cb (1986)

Brass
 Dialogue for horn and tuba (1976)
 Kalends for brass quintet (1981)
 Quantum Quintet for brass quintet (1982)
 Trysts for 2 trumpets (1982)
 Zigzags for tuba (1988)
 First Position for trombone and marimba (1992)
 At the Colour Café for brass choir (4 C tpts, 4 hns, 2 tb, bass tb, tuba, perc) (1997)
 Dialogue Continued for horn, trombone and tuba (2000)
 From Sorrow for trumpet, horn and bass trombone (2001)
 Triple Threat for 3 trumpets (2001)
 Alternating Currents for bass trombone and piano (2002)
 Double Threat for two trumpets (2002)
 Meetings for 2 euphoniums and 2 tubas (2003)
 Protected Sleep for horn and marimba (2006)
 Stories for Our Time  for trumpet and piano, (2007)
 Edinboro Sonata for tuba and piano. (2009)
 Combined Efforts for euphonium, tuba, and piano. (2014) 
 Custom-made Shades for trombone and piano (2015)

Woodwinds
 Three Movements for Saxophone Alone for soprano saxophone (1971)
 Conversations for alto flute and clarinet (1975)
 Speaking Alone for flute (1976)
 Windscape for woodwind quintet (1977)
 Oboe–sthenics for oboe (1980)
 Layered Lament for English horn and electronic tape (1983); Tape realized at the University of Utah Electronic Music Studio.
 On Four for electronic valve instrument, oboe/English horn, and piano 4 hands (1983)
 Restless Winds for woodwind quintet (1986)
 Xenium for flute and piano (1992)
 Taming the Furies for solo flute (2003)
 Interval Untamed: Five Miniatures for alto saxophone (2010) 
 Conversations Continued for alto flute and clarinet (2011)
 Tides for clarinet and piano (2011/13)
 Colored Tones for soprano saxophone. (2014)

Strings
 Memories for viola (1974)
 String Quartet (Untitled) (1976)
 Speaking Together for violin and piano (1981)
 Volcanic Songs for harp (1983)
 Azure Skies for violin, cello and harp (1993)
 Duplex Variations violin and piano (1995)
 Paula’s Song for string quartet (1996)
 Obsessions for cello and piano (1999)
 Trial Balance for double bass (1999)
 Reconstructed Music for violin, cello and piano (2002)
 Translations for violin and cello (2004)
 Let's Play for string quartet (2007)
 A Brief Conversation for violin (2012)

Chamber music
 For Him for flute, cello and vibraphone (1975)
 Yet for Him for flute, cello and piano (1980)
 Hollowed Refrains for oboe, violin and piano (1987)
 Unquiet Dreams for clarinet, violin and piano (1992)
 Connections for clarinet, cello and marimba (1994)
 Troubled Repose for flute, viola and double bass (1998)
 Shifting Colors for guitar, percussion, double bass, and piano (2012)

Piano
 Settings for piano (1978)
 Gliffs for piano (1984); Influenced by the dance techniques of Pina Bausch.
 Two/Three (1996)
 Two Bagatelles (2007)
 Three/Four (2007)
 Fleeting Moments for piano (2011/12)

Guitar
 3 Guitars (1980)
 Processional for solo guitar (1996)
 Pregnant Pauses for guitar quartet (2005)
 The Mercurial Guitarist for solo guitar (2012)

Percussion
 Three by Three for percussion trio (1979)
 Pas de Deux for marimba and piano (1991)
 Of Wood and Skins for percussion duo (2003)
 Memories and Alterations solo marimba (2008)

Choral
 For Showing Truth for female chorus a cappella (1972, revised 1978); text by John Keats
 Hymn of Compassionate Love for soloists, choir, trumpet, timpani, and strings (2005); Biblical text: I Corintheans 13
 The Wings of Night for mezzo-soprano and baritone soloists, SATB choir, and guitar. (2008); Texts by Shakespeare, Teasdale, Dickinson, and Colborne-Veel, illustrate the contrasting aspects of night.

Vocal
 In Shadow for soprano, guitar and clarinet (1972); texts by Emily Dickinson
 Echoes of Emily for alto and English horn (1979); texts by Emily Dickinson
 To Love? for bass-baritone and piano (1980); settings of an Elizabethan song and poems by Coventry Patmore and Ralph Waldo Emerson
 Journey Towards Oblivion for soprano, tenor and chamber ensemble (1991); based on texts by Christina Rossetti and D.H. Lawrence
 Mariana for mezzo-soprano, clarinet and piano (1995); text by Alfred Lord Tennyson
 Love Songs for soprano and flute/alto flute (1997) or mezzo-soprano and flute/alto flute (2005); texts by Sara Teasdale
 Wilde’s World for tenor, viola and guitar (2000); text: "To L.L." by Oscar Wilde
 Left Behind for horn and mezzo-soprano (2006); poetry by Edna St. Vincent Millay
 Manhattan Fixation for soprano, mezzo-soprano and cello (solo voices) or female chorus and cello (2008)
 Danish Delights for soprano and guitar (2009); Texts by Sara Teasdale, Corinna, and Thomas Campion.

References

Silverman, Faye-Ellen